Nerabailu  is a village in Yerravaripalem Mandal of Tirupati district.

Demographics

population (2011) - Total	4,253 - males 2,191 -females 2,062 - No. houses.	1,297
population  (2001) - Total 	3,796 - males 1,912 - females 1,884 - No. of houses.  1,050

Tourism
Near by tourist spots Talakona, Nallamalla forest, Tirupati

References

Villages in Tirupati district